Mississippi Highway 366 can refer to either of two state highways in Mississippi that share the same number, but were never connected.
Mississippi Highway 366 (Prentiss County)
Mississippi Highway 366 (Tishomingo County)